The Old Prince Edward County Clerk's Office is a historic clerk's office located at Worsham, Prince Edward County, Virginia. It was built in 1855, and is a one-story, brick building in the Roman Revival style.  It features a one-story front portico with original Tuscan order columns and pilasters.  It served as the clerk's office until the county seat moved to Farmville in 1872. It stands across the road from the Debtors' Prison.

It was listed on the National Register of Historic Places in 1979.

References

Government buildings on the National Register of Historic Places in Virginia
Government buildings completed in 1815
Buildings and structures in Prince Edward County, Virginia
National Register of Historic Places in Prince Edward County, Virginia